The Scarlet Woman is a lost 1916 silent film melodrama directed by Edmund Lawrence and starring Madame Olga Petrova. It was distributed by Metro Pictures, then a newly formed organization.

Cast
Olga Petrova - Thora Davis
Edward Martindel - Hanlin Davis
Arthur Hoops - Clinton Hastings
Eugene O'Brien - Robert Blake
Frances Gordon - Paula Gordon
Frank Hanna

References

External links

1916 films
American silent feature films
Lost American films
American black-and-white films
Silent American drama films
1916 drama films
Melodrama films
Metro Pictures films
1916 lost films
Lost drama films
1910s American films